ASV Berlin is a prominent local German basketball club based in Berlin, and is also known as Allgemeiner Sportverein Moabit.

Basketball teams in Germany
Sport in Berlin